Leonard Charles Williams (born February 16, 1945) is an American singer-songwriter and musician, best known as the lead vocalist for the soul/funk group Tower of Power in the early 1970s. As a solo artist, Williams made several hit recordings, including 1978's "Cause I Love You" and 1977's "Choosing You".

Early life and career
Williams was born in Little Rock, Arkansas, and moved to Oakland, California, before the age of 1. Learning to play the trumpet in elementary school fueled his interest in music; his skills as a vocalist were first nurtured by singing in gospel choirs and groups around the Bay Area. He worked with several notable artists, such as Sly Stone, Andraé Crouch, Billy Preston and members of the Hawkins family, Edwin, Walter and Tramaine.

Professional recordings
After winning several local talent contests, Williams signed his first recording contract with Fantasy Records.  He cut two singles for the label, including "Lisa's Gone" and "Feelin Blue", written by John Fogerty of Creedence Clearwater Revival. In 1972, Williams joined the emerging funk band Tower of Power.  A string of hits followed, including "So Very Hard to Go", "What Is Hip", "Don't Change Horses (In The Middle of the Stream)" and "Willing To Learn".  During his two years with the group, Williams participated in three albums: Back To Oakland, Urban Renewal and the gold LP Tower of Power. Williams and Tower of Power toured throughout the United States, Europe and Asia.

Solo works
While still with Tower of Power, he recorded his first solo album Pray for the Lion for Warner Bros. Records in 1974. At the end of 1975, Williams left the band and returned to his solo projects.  Initially signing with Motown Records in 1975, he later moved to ABC Records in 1977 (which was then purchased by MCA Records in 1979).  With producer Frank Wilson at the helm and songwriters such as Judy Wieder, Clay Drayton, Terry McFadden, and John Footman, over the next four years, he scored ten chart hits, including "Shoo Doo FuFu Ooh", "Choosing You", "You Got Me Running", "Love Hurt Me Love Healed Me", "Here's to the Lady," and "Midnight Girl". Williams recorded four more albums from 1977 to 1980: Choosing You, his first gold LP; Spark of Love (contains the hits "You Got Me Running", and "Cause I Love You" as well as "Midnight Girl"); Love Current; "Taking Chances" and Let's Do It Today.

After leaving MCA, Williams recorded for the independent record labels, Rockshire and Knobhill. In 1986, he was invited to sing vocals on "Don't Make Me Wait For Love", a track from Duotones, a multi-platinum recording by Kenny G. The song became a Top 20 Billboard Hot 100 and R&B hit the following year.

His 1978 hit song "Cause I Love You" was sampled by Havoc of Mobb Deep for the track "Nothing Like Home", and by Kanye West for the songs "Overnight Celebrity" by Twista and "I Got A Love" by Jin. The track was sampled a fourth time in 2007 by Scarface for his single "Girl You Know" featuring Trey Songz & Young Jeezy sampled "Let's Talk It Over" for his single "I Do" featuring Jay-Z and Andre 3000. His song "Half Past Love" was also sampled by The Coup for their 2006 single "My Favorite Mutiny" featuring Black Thought of The Roots and Talib Kweli of Black Star.

Since that time, Williams has continued his solo career, touring the US, Europe and South Africa, and has also expanded his career to include acting, starring in several stage plays, including Love on Lay Away starring Deborah Cox, Mel Jackson and Martha Wash; What Men Don't Tell starring Kenny Lattimore, Chante Moore, and Dottie Peoples; and When A Woman's Fed Up. He is also one of the featured artists on Urbanland Music's DVD The Big Show, recorded at the Orpheum Theatre in Boston, Massachusetts, on November 29, 2002.

Discography

With Tower of Power
1973: Tower of Power (Warner Bros. Records)
1974: Back to Oakland (Warner Bros. Records)
1975: Urban Renewal (Warner Bros. Records)

Studio albums
1974: Pray for the Lion (Warner Bros. Records)
1975: Rise Sleeping Beauty (Motown Records)
1977: Choosing You (ABC Records)
1978: Spark of Love (ABC Records)
1979: Love Current (MCA Records)
1980: Let's Do It Today (MCA Records)
1981: Taking Chances (MCA Records)
1984: Changing (Rocshire Records)
1986: New Episode (Knobhill Records)
1989: Layin' In Wait (K-Tel Records)
1994: Chill (Marathon Records & Bellmark Records, 2020 Reissue by SoulMusic Records)
1996: Here's to the Lady (Universal Special Products)
2000: Love Therapy (Volt Records)
2004: My Way (Thump Records)
2007: It Must Be Love (LenTom Records)
2009: Unfinished Business (Lentom Records)
2012: Still in the Game (Music Access Inc)
2020: Fine (Bridle Ridge Records)

Compilation albums
1993: Ooh Child (MCA Special Products)
2001: Ultimate Collection (Universal)
2002: Ten Ways of Lovin' You (Volt Records)
2008: You Won My Heart (Crush Records)

References

External links
Official site
Artist profile at SoulWalking.com

Lenny Williams 2012 Audio Interview at Soulinterviews.com

Musicians from Little Rock, Arkansas
Musicians from Oakland, California
20th-century African-American male singers
American soul singers
Tower of Power members
Living people
1945 births
Singers from Arkansas
20th-century American singers
21st-century American singers
People from Oakland, California
20th-century American male singers
21st-century American male singers
21st-century African-American male singers